Joan Baez, also known as Joan Baez, Vol. 1, is the debut solo album by folk singer Joan Baez.  The album was recorded in the summer of 1960 and released the same year.  The original release featured 13 traditional folk songs. Later reissues included three additional songs.

In 2015, the album was selected for induction into National Recording Registry of the Library of Congress for special recognition and preservation as one of the sound recordings in over 130 years of recording history that has "cultural, artistic and/or historical significance to American society and the nation's audio legacy".

History
Baez came to prominence during the Folk Music Revival in the late 1950s, particularly in the first Newport Folk Festival in July 1959. A number of companies tried to sign her after her performance at the music festival, including Columbia, but she chose to go instead with the small independent label, Vanguard.  Baez recorded the album for the label in the summer of 1960, when she was 19.

Most of the songs featured only Baez' vocals and guitar, with a second guitar (played by Fred Hellerman, of The Weavers), added to some songs. The album went gold, although it did not make the Billboard 200 chart until 1962, following the success of her second album, Joan Baez, Vol. 2. Joan Baez peaked at number 15 and spent 140 weeks on the chart.

In 1983 Baez described the making of the album to Rolling Stone'''s Kurt Loder:

In 2001, Vanguard reissued Joan Baez with new liner notes and three previously unreleased songs. (Between 2001 and 2005, they reissued remastered versions of Baez' 13 original albums with the label.)

In 2014, Waxtime Records reissued Joan Baez with new liner notes and only two bonus tracks from  earlier Baez sessions that were originally released in 1959 on the compilation LP Folksingers'  Round Harvard Square''.

Reception 

In his Allmusic review, music critic Bruce Eder gave the album five out of five stars, commenting that the purity of the sound was notable at the time. He wrote of the album "Baez gives a fine account of the most reserved and least confrontational aspects of the folk revival, presenting a brace of traditional songs (most notably "East Virginia" and "Mary Hamilton") with an urgency and sincerity that makes the listener feel as though they were being sung for the first time".

Accolades

The album was included in Robert Dimery's 1001 Albums You Must Hear Before You Die.

In 2015, the album was deemed "culturally, historically, or aesthetically significant" by the Library of Congress and selected for inclusion in the National Recording Registry.

Track listing

Charts and certifications

Charts

Certifications

References

1960 debut albums
Joan Baez albums
Albums produced by Maynard Solomon
Vanguard Records albums
United States National Recording Registry recordings
United States National Recording Registry albums